Vellinezhi is a small but culturally crucial village located in Palakkad district of Kerala in southern India.

Geography
The sylvan, rugged land is located on the banks of the Kunti, a slender rivulet that forms tributary to the broad, west-flowing Bharatapuzha that criss-crosses central Kerala in southern India. Vellinezhi is located about 25 km north of Ottapalam in Palakkad district. The nearest small town is Cherpulassery, some seven kilometres away.

Art and culture
It is famous for the huge number of Kathakali and traditional Kerala percussion artistes it has churned out over a period of decades and centuries—in a hoary way in its feudal past, and at a relatively slower place in today's liberal-economy world.

Art Village

Though Vellinezhi was known for its tradition of Art and as a birthplace of many famous artists, the idea of Kalagramam is a recent development. It all started with the publication of a series of articles about Vellinezhi, under the title Kaliyarangite Paitrukam (The Tradition of Kathakali Theatre) in the Malayalam Daily Malayala Manorama during July 9–14, 2012. These articles projected the traditional importance of Vellinezhi and its art forms. Another daily Mathrubhumi followed the suit for two days (July 12, 13). From 21 to 27 August Malayala Manorama conducted a Seminar on the subject of Kalagramam. This Seminar kindled interest and awareness in public and many Subsequently, the matter was put up to higher governmental authorities. Cultural Organisations, Artistes and connoisseurs unanimously supported the project put forward by Malayala Manorama. Hon. District Collector Sri P. M. Ali Asgar Pasha, IAS took special interest and on his request, the District Tourism Promotion Council came forward with Development programmes. Sri P. N. Suresh, Hon. Vice-Chancellor, Kalamandalam The Deemed University of Arts drafted a detailed plan for execution to bring the dream to reality.

On October 13 Sri. Anil Kumar, Hon. Minister of Tourism inaugurated the Seminar on Vellinezhi Kalagramam. In this function, the Minister officially declared Vellinezhi as Kalagramam. In the open forum discussion M. P. Rajesh (Hon. M.P ), Smt. K.S. Saleekha (Hon. M.L.A.), P. N. Suresh (Hon. Vice-chancellor, Kalamandalam Deemed University of Arts), K.A. Francis (Chairman, Kerala Lalithakala Academy), T.N. Kandamuthan (President,
District Panchayat), K. C. Raman Kutty (President, Block Panchayat), Smt. C. G. Geetha (President, Gram Panchayat), V. Haridas (Vice President, Gram Panchayat), O. N. Damodaran Nambuthiripad, Roy Philip (Co-ordinating Editor, Malayala Manorama) and many distinguished personalities from all political parties and from different walks of life actively participated. They unanimously offered their whole-hearted support for the concept of Kalagramam.

On January 5, 2013, a formal official meeting was called by the District Collector in his chamber. The plan of operation was discussed. It was felt that an advisory body is to be formed for planning and executing Kalagramam Projects. As a result of this Dr.Vellinezhi Achuthankutty was appointed as chief coordinator of Kalagramam project. Dr.Vellinezhi Achuthankutty is a retired scientist from Bhaba Atomic Research Centre.

History
Vellinezhi is one of the 14 desams (small duchy-like territories), and is home to Olappamanna Mana, one of the centuries-old feudal Namboothiri (Kerala Brahmin) mansions (Illam). Olappamanna, now a vacated abode that exists as a trust that lets its premises out for weddings and film/docu/teleserial shoots, was, in its heyday till the mid-20th century, the residence of Kunjunni Nambudiripad on whom the title of Rao Bahadur was awarded by the ruling British. And more recently, it also gave birth to the renowned scholar, the late O.M.C. Narayanan Nambudiripad (who gave a Malayalam interpretration to the Rigveda), the late poet Mahakavi Subrahmanian Nambudiripad (simply Olappamanna, his pen name and ancestral home name) and author-scholar Dr. O. M. Anujan. In the early 20th century, it was in Olappamanna Mana that the legendary Pattikkamthodi Ravunni Menon redefined the aesthetics of the Kalluvazhi tradition of Kathakali.

Political history
This place was originally a part of the Nedunganad Swaroopam dynasty who sway over a large part of present-day Pattambi and Ottapalam Taluks. By the end of the 15th century CE, Nedunganad came under the leadership of the Zamorin of Calicut, who was also the main ruler of South Malabar region. The Zamorin appointed his local chieftain at Kavalappara Kovilakam to rule this area. It was a part of Walluvanad Taluk in Malappuram Revenue Division of Malabar District during British Raj, with the Taluk headquarters at Perinthalmanna.

Temples
Revolving around the cultural patronage of the Olappamanna Mana and the locally famous temples like Sri * Kanthalloor kshethram and Chenginikottu Kavu, Vellinezhi has grown in stature as the homestead of a few classical Kerala art forms. Primary among them is the dance-drama, Kathakali, the technical precision and aesthetic quality of which rose to great heights during the life and times of Pattikkamthodi Ravunni Menon who polished and made the Kalluvazhi style of the art artfully elaborate. It is his set of disciples, along with the playback musicians, percussionists, make-up (chutti), costumes (petti) artistes that he groomed who later made Vellinezhi proud. The village, critically, has a house named Kothavil that has specialised in the craft of designing and making Kathakali costumes.

Music and dance
Kerala-style percussion ensembles like chenda melam, thayambaka and panchavadyam too have enriched from a flurry of artistes that Vellinezhi has produced over the years.

Schools
The village has a high school that included Kathakali teachers and allied tutors among its faculty. Vellinezhi has also been the chief locale for Vanaprastham, an acclaimed Malayalam feature film that has won several awards. In fact, the house of Kunjukkutan, the protagonist in the movie (played by Mohanlal), had been the residence of the late Kathakali guru Padma Shri Keezhpadam Kumaran Nair.

Location
The village lies about 40 km west of Palakkad town, and approximately 100 km north of Nedumbassery international airport.

Demographics
The heritage village of Vellinezhi is now slowly but steadily transforming to a more populous, mixed-culture locality like most pockets of Kerala. Even so, it has a dense air of Kathakali and traditional arts; its people are getting less related to Kathakali and are finding new jobs. Yet, even among the growing culture of planting rubber estates, it manages to produce young artistes belonging to a traditional, ethnic art—largely Kathakali and Kerala's percussion concerts like chenda melam and panchavadyam.

Notable people 
1.Pattikkamthodi Ravunni Menon, Kathakali Artist.
2.Keezhpadam Kumaran Nair, Kathakali Artist and Teacher.
3.O.M.C. Narayanan Nambudiripad, Poet and Scholar.
4.Mahakavi Subrahmanian Nambudiripad, Poet and Scholar.
5.Kunjunni Nambudiripad, Poet and Scholar.
6.Ramankutty Nair, Kathakali Artist.
7.O. M. Anujan, Kathakali Scholar and Poet.
8.Mattannoor Sankarankutty, Chenda Artist.
9.Vazhenkada Vijayan, Kathakali Artist.
10.Vellinezhi Achuthankutty, Former scientist of Bhabha Atomic Research Centre and a Senior Theatre Scholar.
11.Padmanabhan Nair, Kathakali Artist.
12.Satheesh Vellinezhi, Caroonist and Journalist.
13.Suresh K. Nair, Visual Artist and Teacher.
14.Vellinezhi Harikrishnan, Spiritual leader, Writer, Musician and Vedic Reciter.
15.Vishnu Achutha Menon, Filmmaker, Author and Researcher.
16.Rantheesh Ramakrishnan, Film Visual Effects Artist and Cine Artist.
17.Mattannoor Sreekanth, Chenda Artist.
18.Mattannoor Sreeraj, Chenda Artist.

See also
Walluvanad Taluk

References

1. Vishnu Achutha Menon & Krishnanunni R (2019) The Voyage of vellinezhi by Economic and Political Weekly
2. S Rajendu (2012). Nedumangad Charithram, Kerala..
3. Vellinezhi Achuthankutty (2018). Valluvanadan kalakalum vellinezhi kalagramavum by Natakkam publishers. Kerala.
4.  Logan (1887). Malabar (2 vols). Madras.

External links 
 Olappamannamana Website
Vellinezhi Kalagramam
Adakkaputhur

Kathakali
Villages in Palakkad district